Farsan County is in Chaharmahal and Bakhtiari province, Iran. The capital of the county is the city of Farsan. At the 2006 census, the county's population was 90,111 in 19,878 households. The following census in 2011 counted 93,941 people in 24,747 households. At the 2016 census the county's population was 95,286, in 26,914 households.

Administrative divisions

The population history and structural changes of Farsan County's administrative divisions over three consecutive censuses are shown in the following table. The latest census shows three districts, five rural districts, and six cities.

References

 

Counties of Chaharmahal and Bakhtiari Province